The 1976 Canadian Open was the third edition of the professional invitational snooker tournament, the Canadian Open, which took place in September 1976.

John Spencer won the title defeating Alex Higgins 17–9 in the final.

Main draw

References

1976 in snooker
Open
Open